The Binet equation, derived by Jacques Philippe Marie Binet, provides the form of a central force given the shape of the orbital motion in plane polar coordinates.  The equation can also be used to derive the shape of the orbit for a given force law, but this usually involves the solution to a second order nonlinear ordinary differential equation.  A unique solution is impossible in the case of circular motion about the center of force.

Equation
The shape of an orbit is often conveniently described in terms of relative distance  as a function of angle . The Binet equation, derived in the next section, gives the force in terms of the function :

Derivation
Newton's Second Law for a purely central force is

The conservation of angular momentum requires that

Combining all of the above, we arrive at

The general solution is 
 where  is the initial coordinate of the particle.

Examples

Kepler problem

Classical 
The traditional Kepler problem of calculating the orbit of an inverse square law may be read off from the Binet equation as the solution to the differential equation

If the angle  is measured from the periapsis, then the general solution for the orbit expressed in (reciprocal) polar coordinates is

The above polar equation describes conic sections, with  the semi-latus rectum (equal to ) and  the orbital eccentricity.

Relativistic 
The relativistic equation derived for Schwarzschild coordinates is

And for Reissner–Nordström metric we will obtain

Inverse Kepler problem
Consider the inverse Kepler problem.  What kind of force law produces a noncircular elliptical orbit (or more generally a noncircular conic section) around a focus of the ellipse?

Differentiating twice the above polar equation for an ellipse gives

The force law is therefore

which is the anticipated inverse square law.  Matching the orbital  to physical values like  or  reproduces Newton's law of universal gravitation or Coulomb's law, respectively.

The effective force for Schwarzschild coordinates is

where the second term is an inverse-quartic force corresponding to quadrupole effects such as the angular shift of periapsis (It can be also obtained via retarded potentials).

In the parameterized post-Newtonian formalism we will obtain

Cotes spirals
An inverse cube force law has the form

The shapes of the orbits of an inverse cube law are known as Cotes spirals.  The Binet equation shows that the orbits must be solutions to the equation

The differential equation has three kinds of solutions, in analogy to the different conic sections of the Kepler problem.  When , the solution is the epispiral, including the pathological case of a straight line when .  When , the solution is the hyperbolic spiral.  When  the solution is Poinsot's spiral.

Off-axis circular motion
Although the Binet equation fails to give a unique force law for circular motion about the center of force, the equation can provide a force law when the circle's center and the center of force do not coincide.  Consider for example a circular orbit that passes directly through the center of force.  A (reciprocal) polar equation for such a circular orbit of diameter  is

Differentiating  twice and making use of the Pythagorean identity gives

The force law is thus

Note that solving the general inverse problem, i.e. constructing the orbits of an attractive  force law, is a considerably more difficult problem because it is equivalent to solving

which is a second order nonlinear differential equation.

See also

Classical central-force problem
General relativity
Two-body problem in general relativity
Bertrand's theorem

References

Classical mechanics